Włodarka  is a village in the administrative district of Gmina Trzebiatów, within Gryfice County, West Pomeranian Voivodeship, in north-western Poland.

The village has a population of 226.

References

Villages in Gryfice County